Mohammad Jamali (also Romanized as Moḩammad Jamālī and Muhammad Jamāli) is a village in Shabankareh Rural District, Shabankareh District, Dashtestan County, Bushehr Province, Iran. At the 2006 census, its population was 781, in 171 families.

References 

Populated places in Dashtestan County